James Henry Nicholls (24 September 1908 – 20 August 1984) was an English professional footballer who played as a goalkeeper in the Football League for Manchester City, Brentford and Port Vale.

Career

Early years 
A goalkeeper, in his early career Nicholls played for Darlaston, Cradley Heath, Sunbeam Motor Works, Bloxwich Strollers, Bilston United, Blackpool and Manchester City. He made 16 First Division appearances for the latter club.

Brentford 
Nicholls transferred to Second Division club Brentford during the 1934 off-season. Unable to oust James Mathieson from the team, Nicholls failed to make a first team appearance during his first two seasons at Griffin Park and instead played for the reserve team, with which he won the London Challenge Cup in 1934–35. With the Bees then in the First Division, Nicholls finally made his first team debut in a 1–1 draw with Huddersfield Town on 12 September 1936. He made six further appearances during the 1936–37 season, before returning to the reserves and leaving the club at the end of the campaign.

Port Vale 
Nicholls joined Third Division North club Port Vale in June 1937, as a replacement for Allan Todd. He made his debut in a 3–0 defeat to Oldham Athletic at Boundary Park on 28 August and played the first 16 games of the 1937–38 season, until suffering a knee injury in December 1937. Goalkeeper George Heppell established himself in the position, which left Nicholls surplus to requirements and he departed The Old Recreation Ground at the end of 1937–38 season.

Career statistics

Honours
Brentford Reserves
 London Challenge Cup: 1934–35

References

1908 births
1984 deaths
People from Bilston
English footballers
Association football goalkeepers
Darlaston Town F.C. players
Cradley Heath F.C. players
Bloxwich Strollers F.C. players
Bilston Town F.C. players
Blackpool F.C. players
Manchester City F.C. players
Brentford F.C. players
Port Vale F.C. players
English Football League players